"Isi" was a 1975 single by the German band Neu!, released in the United Kingdom to promote their album Neu! '75. Like its predecessor "Super"/"Neuschnee", "Isi" failed to chart and is now a collectors' item due to its rarity. It was sold in an unmarked paper sleeve by United Artists, who marketed Neu! in the UK.

Background & Recording

The recording of Neu! '75, the last of Neu!'s original studio albums, was begun in December 1974 at Conny Plank's studio in Cologne. Like Neu! 2, the album has a definite binary nature, with the first side recorded by the original duo of Dinger and Rother, the second by the expanded four-part Neu!-La Düsseldorf supergroup. "Isi" is taken from the album's A or 'Michael Rother' side, whilst "After Eight" is from the Klaus Dinger-La Düsseldorf dominated side of the album. Dinger recognised this duality, admitting that "me and Michael drift[ed] apart," but Rother maintains that "it was the combination of our two strengths which made the magic."  Either way, Dinger's apparent contribution to "Rother's" side of the single is limited to the drums on Isi, whilst Rother's contribution to the "La Düsseldorf" side is the guitar solo, on "After Eight". Neu! '75 was also the first album for which Dinger wrote lyrics, and the subject matter was largely his now ended romance with Anita. The lyrics of "After Eight" feature the repeated refrain, "Help me through the night."

Track listing
All tracks composed by Klaus Dinger and Michael Rother.

 "Isi" – 3:55
 "After Eight" – 4:42

Personnel
 Michael Rother – guitar, keyboards, production
 Klaus Dinger – drums

References

1975 songs
Neu! songs
Songs written by Klaus Dinger
Songs written by Michael Rother